Melitoma is a genus of chimney bees in the family Apidae. There are about 13 described species in Melitoma. Found in the Nearctic and Neotropics.

Species
These 11 species belong to the genus Melitoma:
 Melitoma ameghinoi (Holmberg, 1903) i c g
 Melitoma bifax Vachal, 1909 i c g
 Melitoma grisella (Cockerell & Porter, 1899) i c g
 Melitoma ipomoearum Ducke, 1913 i c g
 Melitoma marginella (Cresson, 1872) i c g b
 Melitoma nudicauda Cockerell, 1949 i c g
 Melitoma nudipes (Burmeister, 1876) i c g
 Melitoma osmioides (Ducke, 1908) i c g
 Melitoma segmentaria (Fabricius, 1804) i c g
 Melitoma strenua (Holmberg, 1903) i c g
 Melitoma taurea (Say, 1837) i c g b (mallow bee)
Data sources: i = ITIS, c = Catalogue of Life, g = GBIF, b = Bugguide.net

References

Further reading

External links

 

Apinae